The 2015 The Citadel Bulldogs football team represented The Citadel, The Military College of South Carolina in the 2015 NCAA Division I FCS football season. The Bulldogs were led by second-year head coach Mike Houston and played their home games at Johnson Hagood Stadium. They played as members of the Southern Conference, as they have since 1936. They finished the season 9–4, 6–1 in SoCon play to finish in a share for the SoCon title with Chattanooga. Due to their head-to-head loss to Chattanooga, they did not receive the SoCon's automatic bid to the FCS Playoffs. However, they received an at-large bid to the FCS Playoffs where they defeated Coastal Carolina in the first round before losing in the second round to Charleston Southern.

On January 18, head coach Mike Houston resigned to become the head coach at James Madison. He finished at The Citadel with a two-year record of 14–11.

Before the season

Previous season

The Bulldogs finished 5–7 overall and 3–4 in the conference.

Returning starters
Ten starters returned on offense, with only QB Aaron Miller lost to graduation.

Outlook
The Bulldogs were picked to finish 7th in the 8 team Southern Conference.  No players were named to national award watch lists or the preseason All-America teams, but OL Sam Frye and DL Mitchell Jeter were named to the preseason All-Conference first team.

Schedule

Personnel

Roster

Depth chart

Game summaries

Davidson

Western Carolina

Georgia Southern

Charleston Southern

Wofford

Samford

Furman

Mercer

VMI

Chattanooga

South Carolina

FCS playoffs

First round – Coastal Carolina

Second round – Charleston Southern

Ranking movements

Honors and awards
Preseason All-Southern Conference
Sam Frye (1st team)
Mitchell Jeter (1st team)

References

Citadel
The Citadel Bulldogs football seasons
Southern Conference football champion seasons
The Citadel
Citadel football